Antonini is an Italian surname derived from Antonius. It is also an occasional masculine given name that may refer to

Given name
Antonini Čulina (born 1992), Croatian football player

Surname
Alberto Antonini (born 1959), Italian oenologist and winery consultant 
Alessio Antonini (born 1949), Italian racing cyclist 
Alfredo Antonini (1901–1983), Italian-American symphony conductor and composer 
Ernesto Ramos Antonini (1898–1963), Puerto Rican politician
Gabriele Antonini (born 1938), Italian film, stage and television actor
Giles of Viterbo (Giles Antonini), a 16th-century Italian cardinal, theologian, orator, humanist and poet
Giovanni Antonini (born 1965), Italian conductor and flute soloist 
Giuseppe Antonini (1914–1989), Italian football midfielder and manager
Guido Alejandro Antonini Wilson, Venezuelan-American entrepreneur, part of the 2007 suitcase scandal  involving Venezuela and Argentina
Adrian Antonini (1972), Two-Time NCAA National Champion - LSU Tigers; Professional Baseball - Philadelphia Phillies 
Joseph E. Antonini (born 1941), American businessman 
Luca Antonini (born 1982), Italian football player
Luigi Antonini (1883–1968), American trade union leader 
Michael Antonini (born 1985), American baseball pitcher 
Pierre Antonini, French mathematician and astronomer 
Simone Antonini (born 1991), Italian racing cyclist
Stefania Antonini (born 1970), Italian football goalkeeper

See also

Antoniani
Antonin (name)
Antonina (name)
Antonine (name)
Antonino (name)
Antoniny (disambiguation) 
Antonioni (surname)
Luigi Antognini

References

Italian-language surnames
Patronymic surnames
Surnames from given names